Chemokine (C-C motif) ligand 3-like 1, also known as CCL3L1, is a protein which in humans is encoded by the CCL3L1 gene.

Function 

This gene is one of several chemokine genes clustered on the q-arm of chromosome 17.  Chemokines are a family of secreted proteins involved in immunoregulatory and inflammatory processes. Specifically, chemokines attract lymphocytes to sites of infection or damage.  This protein binds to several chemokine receptors including chemokine binding protein 2 (CCBP2 or D6) and chemokine (C-C motif) receptor 5 (CCR5).

CCR5 is a co-receptor for HIV, and binding of CCL3L1 to CCR5 inhibits HIV entry. Furthermore, the binding causes the receptor to be taken inside the cell by endocytosis, to eventually be reprocessed and re-expressed.

Gene organization 

The human genome reference assembly contains two full copies of the gene (CCL3L1 and CCL3L3) and an additional partial duplication, which is thought to result in a pseudogene, designated CCL3L2. This record represents the more telomeric full-length gene.

Clinical significance 

The copy number of this gene varies among individuals. This is hypothesized to be due to segmental duplication of the region containing CCL3. Most individuals have 1-6 copies in the diploid genome, although rare individuals have zero or more than six copies. With increased copy number, there is more CCL3L1 expressed, and so competition for the CCR5 binding site is increased. This leads to slower advancement of disease in HIV-infected individuals, giving those with greater copy number more resistance.

Interactions 

CCL3L1 has been shown to interact with CCR5.

References

External links

Further reading